Basoli is an Italian surname. Notable people with the surname include:

Antonio Basoli (1774–1848), Italian painter, interior designer, scenic designer, and engraver
Luigi Basoli (1776–1849), Italian painter, brother of Antonio

Italian-language surnames